Richard Barwick may refer to:

Richard Barwick (zoologist), husband of Diane Barwick
Richard Barwick of the Barwick baronets

See also
Barwick (surname)